Max Studer (born 16 January 1996) is a Swiss triathlete. He competed in the men's event at the 2020 Summer Olympics held in Tokyo, Japan. He also competed in the mixed relay event.

References

External links
 

1996 births
Living people
Swiss male triathletes
Olympic triathletes of Switzerland
Triathletes at the 2020 Summer Olympics
Place of birth missing (living people)
20th-century Swiss people
21st-century Swiss people